Mount Blood is a mountain at the south side of the mouth of Somero Glacier, 2.5 nautical miles (4.6 km) northeast of Mount Johnstone, in the Queen Maud Mountains. Named by Advisory Committee on Antarctic Names (US-ACAN) for Richard H. Blood, United States Antarctic Research Program (USARP) ionospheric physicist at the South Pole Station, winter 1965.

Mountains of the Ross Dependency
Amundsen Coast